Lyle Moevao (born January 17, 1987) is a former professional and college football quarterback for the Oregon State Beavers football team.
He played professionally in France for the La Courneuve Flash and Japan.  Moevao was the starting quarterback for Oregon State for the 2008 season, throwing for 2,534 yards and 19 touchdowns with a quarterback rating of 128.41. He also helped the Beavers to a 3–0 victory in the 2008 Sun Bowl against the Pittsburgh Panthers.

He was recently the Defensive Analyst for San Jose State University. Previous coaching stops in include Runningbacks coach for Northern Colorado University (2020), San Antonio Commanders-AAF (2019), Quarterbacks Coach @ Lewis & Clark College (2017-2018), QC/GA @ Oregon State University (2013-2016). He played professionally for 2 years in France (2011) and Japan (2012) top-level league after his college career.

College career
Moevao attended Oregon State University, where he played for the Oregon State Beavers football team for four seasons (2006–2009).  During his time at Oregon State, he continuously battled for playing time alongside Sean Canfield.  Moevao earned three letters for the Beavers and finished his career as one of the most successful quarterbacks in OSU history going 11-4 as a starter. He finished his OSU career ranked in the top 10 in school history with 3,410 passing yards and 21 touchdowns. A pair of injuries ended his career after a single pass during his senior year following a Pac-10 Honorable Mention season as a junior.

Professional career

La Courneuve Flash
In January 2011, Moevao was signed by the La Courneuve Flash of the Ligue Élite de Football Américain. In the French football championship on June 18, 2011, Moevao completed 12 of 17 passes for 190 yards and 2 touchdowns in leading La Courneuve Flash to a 45–27 win over the Grenoble Centaures before a crowd of 7,000. Moevao was selected as Most Valuable Player of the game.

Coaching career
In April 2013, Moevao returned to Oregon State as an associate student intern, working with the running backs and quarterbacks. In 2015–16, he was an Offensive Quality Control assistant.

On February 8, 2017, Moevao was hired as Lewis & Clark's quarterbacks coach.

On November 14, 2018, Moevao became the quarterbacks coach for his former college head coach Mike Riley and the San Antonio Commanders of the Alliance of American Football. Soon after being hired, he was switched to be the running backs coach.

February 2020, Moevao was hired as University of Northern Colorado Runningback Coach/Recruiting Coordinator.

June 2021, Moevao was hired as San Jose State University Defensive Analyst.

References

External links
 CoachMoevao_3 at Twitter
 Lyle Moevao Profile at SJSU.com
 Lyle Moevao Profile at LinkedIn.com
 Profile at ESPN.com
 Profile at osubeavers.com

1987 births
Living people
American football quarterbacks
Oregon State Beavers football players
Players of American football from Torrance, California
Sportspeople from Torrance, California
Lewis & Clark Pioneers football coaches
Oregon State Beavers football coaches
San Antonio Commanders coaches
American expatriate sportspeople in France
American expatriate sportspeople in Japan
American expatriate players of American football